Solna Gymnasium is a secondary school in Solna, Sweden, in the Stockholm metropolitan area. It was opened as the Solna Läroverk in April 1948. Crown Prince Gustaf VI Adolf of Sweden attended the opening.

References

External links
 Solna Gymnasium 

Schools in Sweden
Educational institutions established in 1948
1948 establishments in Sweden